Judith Sievers (born 20 August 1992) is a retired German rower who competed at international elite events. She was a Youth Olympic and a World Junior champion in the single sculls.

Sievers retired from rowing in 2013 due to reoccurring back problems.

References

1992 births
Living people
People from Flensburg
German female rowers
Rowers at the 2010 Summer Youth Olympics
Sportspeople from Schleswig-Holstein